EP 2 (stylized as EP ††) is the second EP by the American musical group Crosses. The EP was self-released on January 24, 2012. The deluxe download version available from the Crosses website included high-resolution front and back artwork, digital booklet, demo "seeds", as well as an exclusive 10-minute video documenting the recording process of the first two EPs and short clips of then-unreleased songs, in addition to the high-quality digital download of the standard digital download version.

EP 2 ranked at No. 8 on Billboard's Top Heatseekers chart.

Track listing 
 "Frontiers" – 4:01
 "Prurient" – 4:06
 "Telepathy" – 3:35
 "Trophy" – 3:52
 "1987" – 3:11

Note: Like the previous EP, all songs (with the exception of 1987) contain a † in place of the letter 't' in their titles.

Personnel 
EP 2 personnel adapted from digital booklet.

Crosses
 Chuck Doom
 Shaun Lopez
 Chino Moreno

Additional musicians
 Stephan Boettcher – mandolin assistance
 Molly Carson – phone call on "Frontiers"
 Chris Robyn (Far) – live drums

Production
 Eric Broyhill – mastering
 Crosses – production
 Brendan Dekora – engineering assistance 
 Shaun Lopez – production, engineering, mixing
 Eric Stenman – mix engineering

Artwork
 Brooke Nipar – photography on front and back covers

References

External links 

2012 EPs
Crosses (band) albums